The 2000 Privilege Insurance British GT Championship was the eighth season of the British GT Championship, an auto racing series organised by the British Racing Drivers Club (BRDC) and sponsored by Privilege.  The races featured grand touring cars conforming to two categories of regulations known as GT and GTO, and awarded a driver championship in each category. The season began on 25 March 2000 and ended on 8 October 2000 after eleven events, eleven held in Great Britain with one race in Belgium.  The series was joined by the BRDC Marcos Mantis Challenge Cup for a few rounds.

Calendar

All races were 60 minutes in duration, although the final round at Silverstone ran for 54 minutes before it was red-flagged due to heavy rain.

Teams and drivers

GT

GTO

* Marcos Mantis challenge competitors, ineligible to score British GT points.

Race Results

GT

GTO

Championship Standings

Points are awarded as follows:

(key)

† – Drivers did not finish the race, but were classified as they completed a sufficient number of laps.
* Marcos Mantis challenge competitors

References

British GT Championship seasons
GT Championship